Progress 13 was a Soviet unmanned Progress cargo spacecraft, which was launched in May 1982 to resupply the Salyut 7 space station.

Spacecraft
Progress 13 was a Progress 7K-TG spacecraft. The thirteenth of forty three to be launched, it had the serial number 114. The Progress 7K-TG spacecraft was the first generation Progress, derived from the Soyuz 7K-T and intended for uncrewed logistics missions to space stations in support of the Salyut programme. On some missions, the spacecraft was also used to adjust the orbit of the space station.

The spacecraft was powered by chemical batteries and could operate in free flight for up to three days, remaining docked at the station for up to thirty.

Launch
Progress 13 launched on 23 May 1982 from the Baikonur Cosmodrome in the Kazakh SSR. It used a Soyuz-U rocket.

Docking
Progress 13 docked with the aft port of Salyut 7 on 25 May 1982 at 07:56:36 UTC and was undocked on 4 June 1982 at 06:31 UTC.

Decay
It remained in orbit until 6 June 1982, when it was deorbited. The deorbit burn occurred at 00:05 UTC, with the mission ending at around 00:50 UTC.

See also

 1982 in spaceflight
 List of Progress missions
 List of uncrewed spaceflights to Salyut space stations

References

Progress (spacecraft) missions
1982 in the Soviet Union
Spacecraft launched in 1982
Spacecraft which reentered in 1982
Spacecraft launched by Soyuz-U rockets